John William Potter (October 25, 1918 – October 3, 2013) was a United States district judge of the United States District Court for the Northern District of Ohio.

Education and career
Born in Toledo, Ohio, Potter  received a Bachelor of Philosophy from the University of Toledo in 1940 and a Juris Doctor from the University of Michigan Law School in 1946. He joined the United States Army Reserve, serving from 1946 to 1951 and achieving the rank of captain. Potter was in private practice in Toledo from 1947 to 1969. He was mayor of Toledo from 1961 to 1967. He was an assistant state attorney general of Ohio from 1968 to 1969, and was then a judge on the Ohio Sixth District Courts of Appeals until 1982.

Federal judicial service

On May 5, 1982, Potter was nominated by President Ronald Reagan to a seat on the United States District Court for the Northern District of Ohio vacated by Judge William Kernahan Thomas. Potter was confirmed by the United States Senate on June 18, 1982, and received his commission on June 21, 1982. He assumed senior status on August 1, 1992, serving in that status until his death on October 3, 2013, in Toledo.

References

Sources
 
John W. Potter Papers The University of Toledo
John William Potter's obituary

1918 births
2013 deaths
Mayors of Toledo, Ohio
Judges of the Ohio District Courts of Appeals
Judges of the United States District Court for the Northern District of Ohio
United States district court judges appointed by Ronald Reagan
20th-century American judges
United States Army officers
University of Toledo alumni
University of Michigan Law School alumni
United States Army reservists